Minuscule 41 (in the Gregory-Aland numbering), is a Greek minuscule manuscript of the New Testament on parchment. Palaeographically it has been assigned to the 11th century. It has marginalia.

Description 

The codex contains the text of the Gospels Matthew and Mark, on 224 parchment leaves, with some lacunae. About 30 leaves lost. 
The large initial letters in red.

The text is written stichometrically in one column per page, 31 lines per page. The biblical text of Matthew and Mark is surrounded by a catena (in Mark commentary of Victorinus).

Text 

Kurt Aland the Greek text of the codex did not place in any Category.

History 

The manuscript was dated by Gregory to the 11th century. Currently it has been assigned by the INTF to the 11th century.

The manuscript was examined and described by Montfaucon, Wettstein, Scholz, and Paulin Martin.

It was added to the list of the New Testament manuscripts by Wettstein. C. R. Gregory saw the manuscript in 1885.

It is currently housed at the Bibliothèque nationale de France (Coislin Gr. 24) at Paris.

See also 

 List of New Testament minuscules
 Biblical manuscript
 Textual criticism
 Minuscule 40

References

Further reading 

 Bernard de Montfaucon, Bibliotheca Coisliniana olim Segueriana, Paris: Ludovicus Guerin & Carolus Robustel, 1715, p. 75.
 Jean-Pierre-Paul Martin, Description technique des manuscrits grecs, relatif au Nouveau Testament, conservé dans les bibliothèques des Paris (Paris 1883), p. 50.

Greek New Testament minuscules
11th-century biblical manuscripts
Fonds Coislin